William F. Nash was a member of the Wisconsin State Assembly and the Wisconsin State Senate.

Biography
Nash was born William Francis Nash on February 22, 1847 in Shelby, New York. He moved with his parents to Rock County, Wisconsin in 1851. During the American Civil War, Nash served with the 13th Wisconsin Volunteer Infantry Regiment of the Union Army. He went on to attend Lawrence University. Nash died on June 26, 1916 in Two Rivers, Wisconsin.

Political career
Nash was a member of the Assembly in 1878 and of the Senate from 1889 to 1894. Additionally, he was Mayor of Two Rivers. He was a Democrat.

References

People from Shelby, New York
People from Rock County, Wisconsin
People from Two Rivers, Wisconsin
Democratic Party Wisconsin state senators
Democratic Party members of the Wisconsin State Assembly
Mayors of places in Wisconsin
People of Wisconsin in the American Civil War
Union Army soldiers
Lawrence University alumni
1847 births
1916 deaths
19th-century American politicians